GVHS may refer to:
Ganapathy Vilasam High School, an aided school in Koovappady, Ernakulam Dist, Kerala
Garnet Valley High School, a public secondary school in Concord Township, Pennsylvania, United States
Genesee Valley High School,  a public secondary school in Belmont, New York, United States
Golden Valley High School (disambiguation), various
Grand Valley High School, a public secondary school in Orwell, Ohio, United States
Green Valley High School, a public secondary school in Henderson, Nevada, United States
Great Valley High School, a public secondary school in Malvern, Pennsylvania, United States
Gypsy Vanner Horse Society, a registry for purebred Gypsy Vanner horses